The 1923 Iowa State Cyclones football team represented Iowa State College of Agricultural and Mechanic Arts (later renamed Iowa State University) in the Missouri Valley Conference during the 1923 college football season. In their second season under head coach Sam Willaman, the Cyclones compiled a 4–3–1 record (3–2–1 against conference opponents), finished in fourth place in the conference, and outscored opponents by a combined total of 121 to 93. They played their home games at State Field in Ames, Iowa. Ira Young was the team captain.

Schedule

Roster

References

Iowa State
Iowa State Cyclones football seasons
Iowa State Cyclones football